Dominique Palmer FRSA (born 7 October 1999) is a British climate justice activist and student. She spoke at 2019 United Nations Climate Change Conference, and began her activism as one of the U.K’s leading U.K environmentalists and youth activists in the School Strike for Climate Movement.

Life and activism 
Dominique grew up in London. She studies Political Science and International Relations at the University of Birmingham. She started  her activism in London , and then became a prominent organiser for the school strike for climate, in the United Kingdom, where she organises climate strikes. During the Covid pandemic, she participated in the #ClimateStrikeOnline.

Palmer focuses on intersectionality and marginalised communities within her activism. She has used this within push for legislation, where she pressured MPs to pass The Wellbeing of Future Generations Bill introduced by Lord Bird. She said she wants to "tackle the systemic inequality of climate change," in response, Debbonaire said the work of Palmer was “brilliant” and “inspiring”.

During her activism she applies pressure on the intersectional nature of the climate crisis. On a New York Times Hub Panel at the 26th United Nations Climate Change Conference, alongside Malala, Emma Watson, Greta Thunberg, Tori Tsui, Daphne Frias, Vanessa Nakate, and Mya Rose Craig. Palmer said that “the exploitation of natural resources and people are linked.” And stressed the urgency of acting in this “Now is the time. Yesterday was the time.” 

She also focuses on utilizing music and the arts. She is an organizer for Climate Live, and led the April 24th event where  Declan Mckenna played in front of the Houses of Parliament, to bring awareness to the climate crisis. In her reason for organising she said "the race to safeguard the future of this planet has begun, and so we must act now. We are not only fighting for our futures, but against the present crisis and those already suffering. We need ambitious systemic change that places people and the planet at the heart of it."

She recorded a song for Earth Day with Titiyo and hosted at Billie Eilish's Overheated event.

She was part of organizing the UK's first Black Ecofeminist Summit.

Palmer also focuses on Eco-Anxiety in young people related to climate change. She said  "I'm looking at the future, and what we face in the future, and there is a lot of fear and anxiety.” Young people, myself included, feel betrayed by world leaders.”. She organises climate action as a method to deal with it 

Alongside fellow activists she has led the campaign in #cleanupStandardChartered, she is one of 12 Fridays For Future organizers who wrote open letters for this, one pressuring the CEO to "stop fuelling the climate crisis", and another to Joe Biden and Kamala Harris, saying that "our present and future depend on the actions your government takes within the next four years."

She has also co-founded the initiative ‘Pass The Mic'

Filmography 
Climate carnage: whose job is it to save the planet? (2022)

References

External links 

 COP26: 3 climate activists on what climate change means to them  | BBC News
Transcript: Episode 1: What does climate change have to do with public health? | UCL Health of the Public - UCL – University College London
COP26 protests: Ashna Hurynag hears from  two of the UK's most high-profile youth activists, Dominique Palmer and Scarlett Westbrook. | Sky News - Daily Climate Cast
Podcast Episode 188: The Dream Not Just the Nightmare- a vision for tackling the climate crisis |  Reasons to be Cheerful with Ed Miliband and Geoff Llyod
How To Find Your Climate Joy | TEDxLondon 
If You Don't Know | BBC Sounds

British activists
1999 births
Living people